The Fair View School is a historic school building at 2367 Mill Creek Road in  Pope County, Arkansas, 4.5 miles northwest of Russellville, Arkansas.  It is a single-story T-shaped fieldstone structure, with a gabled roof and concrete foundation.  The eaves of the roof have exposed rafter ends in the Craftsman style.  The projecting cross-gable section, which forms the short leg of the T, houses the main entrance in a round-arch recess.  The school was built in 1938 with funding support from the Works Progress Administration, and was used as a school until 1960.  It was also an important community resource, playing host to social events and community meetings.

The building was listed on the National Register of Historic Places in 2000.

The buildings and land were sold at auction in 1968, and the Fair View School became a private residence.

See also
National Register of Historic Places listings in Pope County, Arkansas

References

School buildings on the National Register of Historic Places in Arkansas
School buildings completed in 1938
Buildings and structures in Russellville, Arkansas
Schools in Pope County, Arkansas
1938 establishments in Arkansas